(French: lit. The music was generally lighthearted and sometimes risqué or even bawdy but, as opposed to the cabaret tradition, not particularly political or confrontational.

National variations 

The tradition of such establishments as a venue for music has its origins in Paris  and London of the eighteenth century.

Such establishments gained their widest popularity in the late nineteenth and early twentieth centuries with the growth of various other national "schools" of cafè chantant (besides French). Thus, one spoke of an Italian café chantant, German café chantant, or Austrian café chantant. For example, at least one Victorian era premises in England was known as a café chantant. One of the most famous performers in this medium was violinist Georges Boulanger, who performed in this style from 1910 until 1958, and singer Gorella Gori or Zaira Erba who died in 1963.

In Spain, such an establishment was known as a café cantante and became the centre for professional flamenco performances from the mid nineteenth century to the 1920s.

They are described in great detail in the memoirs of such authors as Ahmed Rasim and Sermet Muhtar Alus. Earlier versions of the kafeşantan, known as kahvehane in Turkish, appeared in Istanbul during the Ottoman Era as early as 1554. Hundreds of them were opened continually, most of them with a social club status.

In the Russian Empire, the term was taken wholesale into the Russian language as "kafe-shantan" (кафе-шантан). Odessa was the city best known for its numerous kafe-shantany.

Fundraising for women's suffrage and other causes 
In the twentieth century, Cafe Chantant events were held across the UK by the women's suffrage movement to bring together their supporters and to raise funds. The organization of the events of musical and other performances held the movement were intended to be of a high standard (and unlikely to be risqué although unconventional), so that fundraising this way was successful. Starting in one branch, then rolling out across Scotland, this type of fundraising was led in 1908 by Jessie M.Soga, contralto. A programme for a London Cafe Chantant shows the variety of performances ranging from music or talks, to clairvoyance and jujitsu. 

Prior to that, a Thé and Café Chantant event had been organised in 1900 in Edinburgh by Alice Low (suffragist) and an actor to raise money for a patriotic fund for Scottish soldiers. And later, a similar event for prisoners of war comforts fund, was organised by a 'tea committee' in Leamington Spa, during World War One in 1916.

Literary uses 
Le Café Concert, was a book published by L’Estampe originale in 1893 about the French establishments of that day. The book contains text by Georges Montorgueil. It is illustrated with numerous lithographs by Toulouse-Lautrec and Henri-Gabriel Ibels that mostly feature famous performers or customers from the contemporary Paris scene. 
 
The name Cafe Chantant appears in
 Araby, a short story by James Joyce (written c. 1904-1905; published 1914 in Dubliners)
 The Man Who Was Thursday: A Nightmare, by G. K. Chesterton (published 1908)
 Buddenbrooks, by Thomas Mann (published 1901) in German
 The Sundays of Jean Dézert, by Jean de La Ville de Mirmont (published 1914)

References

Music genres
Fundraising events
Belle Époque